Delone can refer to 

People
 Boris Delaunay
 Delone Carter (b. 1987), American football running back
 Nikolai Borisovich Delone (1926–2008), Soviet physicist 
 William H. DeLone

See also 
 Delone Catholic High School
 Delone set